Edward Lockhart (1915-1995) was an Australian rugby league footballer who played in the 1930s.

Playing career
A local Balmain junior from Rozelle, Lockhart played two first grade seasons in the NSWRFL during 1936–1937.

He played at centre in the 1936 Grand Final for Balmain against Eastern Suburbs which Easts won 32–12 at the Sydney Cricket Ground.  The grand final was also Lockhart's first grade debut.

Death
Lockhart died at Rozelle, New South Wales on 28 October 1995.

References

1915 births
1995 deaths
Australian rugby league players
Balmain Tigers players
Rugby league players from Sydney
Rugby league centres
Rugby league five-eighths
Rugby league halfbacks